In mathematics, especially in order theory, the cofinality cf(A) of a partially ordered set A is the least of the cardinalities of the cofinal subsets of A.

This definition of cofinality relies on the axiom of choice, as it uses the fact that every non-empty set of cardinal numbers has a least member. The cofinality of a partially ordered set A can alternatively be defined as the least ordinal x such that there is a function from x to A with cofinal image. This second definition makes sense without the axiom of choice. If the axiom of choice is assumed, as will be the case in the rest of this article, then the two definitions are equivalent.

Cofinality can be similarly defined for a directed set and is used to generalize the notion of a subsequence in a net.

Examples

  The cofinality of a partially ordered set with greatest element is 1 as the set consisting only of the greatest element is cofinal (and must be contained in every other cofinal subset).
 In particular, the cofinality of any nonzero finite ordinal, or indeed any finite directed set, is 1, since such sets have a greatest element.
 Every cofinal subset of a partially ordered set must contain all maximal elements of that set. Thus the cofinality of a finite partially ordered set is equal to the number of its maximal elements.
 In particular, let  be a set of size  and consider the set of subsets of  containing no more than  elements.  This is partially ordered under inclusion and the subsets with  elements are maximal.  Thus the cofinality of this poset is  choose 

Properties

Cofinality of ordinals and other well-ordered sets

The cofinality of an ordinal  is the smallest ordinal  that is the order type of a cofinal subset of   The cofinality of a set of ordinals or any other well-ordered set is the cofinality of the order type of that set.

The cofinality of 0 is 0. The cofinality of any successor ordinal is 1.  The cofinality of any nonzero limit ordinal is an infinite regular cardinal.

Regular and singular ordinals

A regular ordinal is an ordinal that is equal to its cofinality. A singular ordinal is any ordinal that is not regular.

Every regular ordinal is the initial ordinal of a cardinal. Any limit of regular ordinals is a limit of initial ordinals and thus is also initial but need not be regular.

Cofinality of cardinals

That the set above is nonempty comes from the fact that

that is, the disjoint union of  singleton sets. This implies immediately that  
The cofinality of any totally ordered set is regular, so 

The last inequality implies that the cofinality of the cardinality of the continuum must be uncountable. On the other hand,

Therefore,

(Compare to the continuum hypothesis, which states )

Generalizing this argument, one can prove that for a limit ordinal 

On the other hand, if the axiom of choice holds, then for a successor or zero ordinal

See also

References

 Jech, Thomas, 2003. Set Theory: The Third Millennium Edition, Revised and Expanded.  Springer.  .
 Kunen, Kenneth, 1980. Set Theory: An Introduction to Independence Proofs. Elsevier.  .

Cardinal numbers
Order theory
Ordinal numbers
Set theory